Badsha – The Don is a 2016 Indian-Bangladeshi action comedy film directed by Baba Yadav. It was produced by Eskay Movies and Jaaz Multimedia. It is a remake of the 2010 Telugu movie Don Seenu starring Ravi Teja. The film stars Indian Bengali film actor Jeet and Bangladeshi television host and film actress Nusrat Faria. Badsha is the third collaboration between Baba Yadav and Jeet after Boss: Born to Rule (2013) and Game (2014). Badsha was a flop at the box office.

Cast
 Jeet as Badsha, a village boy of Jiagunj.
 Nusrat Faria as Shreya
 Shraddha Das as Priya, Shreya's best friend
 Ferdous Ahmed as Jayanta alias Johnny Bhai
 Sushoma Sarkar as Badsha's sister
 Rajatava Dutta as Tarun alias Tony Bhai
 Mahesh Manjrekar as Shyam Bhai, underworld Don
 Biswanath Basu as Monty, Badsha's friend
 Raja Dutta as MLA's right hand
 Pradip Dhar as Tony's henchman
 Sumit Ganguly as Johnny's henchman

Plot
A story of a boy who always wanted to be a Don from childhood. He reaches to London, England, where he friends a girl named Shreya and he fall in love with her.

Production and development
The muhurat of Badsha was in February 2016 in Kolkata. Ashok Dhanuka said shooting was due to start in May.

Soundtrack

The soundtrack was released on 27 June 2016. Track listing via Saavn.

Accolades

References

External links
 

2016 films
2010s Bengali-language films
Bengali-language Bangladeshi films
Bengali-language Indian films
Films scored by Akassh
Films scored by Shuddho Roy
Bengali remakes of Telugu films
Bangladeshi remakes of Indian films
Films directed by Baba Yadav
Bangladeshi remakes of Telugu films
Jaaz Multimedia films